Osmania University Common Entrance Test or OUCET is a post graduate eligibility test conducted by Osmania University. There are about 19,000 seats at Osmania University, Palamuru University, Mahabubnagar; Mahatma Gandhi University, Nalgonda and Telangana University, Nizamabad. The entrance test is held in May/June every year.

History
Osmania University started conducting the common entrance test for universities located in Telangana region since 2011.

Format and timing
The test is held in 52 subjects that includes 39 PG  courses, 10 PG diploma courses and 3 five years integrated courses.

The entrance examination is a two-hour multiple choice question paper. The subject wise ranks are sorted and sent to students.

Result
The results are out in June and counseling for allotment of seats is held in end of June and the academic year starts in July.

Seats distribution
Total seats - 18,881

University campus colleges seats at 4 universities  are 4500 and the rest in affiliated colleges.
 Osmania University - 13,027
 Telangana University - 1,990
 Mahatma Gandhi University - 2630
 Palamuru University - 1234

References

Standardised tests in India
Osmania University
2011 establishments in Andhra Pradesh